Gheorghe Constantin (14 December 1932 – 9 March 2010) was a Romanian former footballer and coach. Known as The Professor, he was a symbol of Steaua București.

Club career
Constantin made his debut for Unirea Tricolor's youth team, and shortly after their abolition he signed with Venus UCB. He played only a year for his new club, before moving to Avântul Reghin and then CFR Iaşi before he signed a contract with Steaua București. He played for Steaua 15-years, scoring 149 goals in Divizia A. Romanian Communist authorities allow him to play abroad for Kayserispor in Turkey.

He made his debut in the Romania national team against Yugoslavia; that was a game made notable by the fact that the whole Romanian team was made up of players from Steaua București. Constantin was also a member of the Romanian soccer team at the 1964 Summer Olympics.

Managerial career
After his return from Turkey, he was appointed by Steaua București as an assistant manager. Constantin was the manager of the team in 1973, but after only a short period he moved to Bacău. After Bacău, he managed FCM Galaţi, but returned to Steaua in 1978. He won the Romanian Cup in his second spell there, then left the club to manage Politehnica Iaşi. In 1983, he was appointed the manager of Steaua București's second team, Steaua Mecanică Fină București. He managed a number of clubs in his native country and also coached in Turkey.

Career statistics

International goals

Honours

Player

Club
Steaua Bucharest
Romanian League (4):   1956, 1960, 1961, 1968
Romanian Cup (4): 1955, 1962, 1966, 1967

Individual
Romanian League Top Scorer (3): 1960, 1961, 1962

Manager
Steaua Bucharest
 Romanian Cup: 1978–79
 Romanian League Runners-up: 1979–80

Politehnica Iaşi
 Romanian Second League: 1981–82

Notes

References

Further reading
 Marius Popescu, I se spune Profesorul..., Editura Militară, București, 1969.

External links
 
 
 SteauaFC profile  
 
 Gheorghe Constantin's coaching career in Liga I at labtof.ro 
 

1932 births
2010 deaths
Footballers from Bucharest
Association football forwards
Romanian footballers
Romania international footballers
Olympic footballers of Romania
Footballers at the 1964 Summer Olympics
Liga I players
Liga II players
Unirea Tricolor București players
Venus București players
CSM Avântul Reghin players
FC Politehnica Iași (1945) players
CIL Sighetu Marmației players
FC Steaua București players
Kayserispor footballers
FCV Farul Constanța players
Romanian football managers
FC Steaua București managers
FC Steaua București assistant managers
FC Rapid București managers
FCM Bacău managers
FCV Farul Constanța managers
FC Gloria Buzău managers
Fenerbahçe football managers
CS Universitatea Craiova managers
ASC Oțelul Galați managers
Romania national football team managers